Woodbridge Nathan Ferris (January 6, 1853March 23, 1928) was an American educator from New York, Illinois and Michigan who served as the 28th governor of Michigan and in the United States Senate as a Democrat.

Early life in New York, Michigan and Illinois
Ferris was born to John Ferris Jr. and Estella (Reed) Ferris in a log cabin near Spencer, New York, and attended the academies of Spencer, Candor, and Owego, and the Oswego Normal Training School (now State University of New York at Oswego) from 1870 to 1873. He went to the medical department of the University of Michigan from 1873 to 1874.

In April 1874, Ferris returned to his home state and on December 23 in Fulton, he married Helen Frances Gillespie (born September 7, 1853). The couple had three sons: Carleton Gillespie (1876–1961), Clifford Wendell (1881, died just after three months), and Phelps Fitch (1889–1935). Ferris taught at Spencer Academy from 1874 to 1875.

He then moved to Freeport, Illinois, and became principal of the Freeport Business College and Academy from 1875 to 1876 and then principal of the Normal Department of the Rock River University, 1876-1877. Then he taught in Dixon, Illinois, where he was also co-founder of the Dixon Business College and Academy, 1877–1879. Ferris then became superintendent of schools in Pittsfield, Illinois, from 1879 to 1884.

Life and politics in Michigan

Ferris then settled in Big Rapids, Michigan, where in 1884 he established the Ferris Industrial School (which became Ferris State University). There he received the nickname "The Big Rapids Schoolmaster", and served as president until his death. He was also president of the Big Rapids Savings Bank.

In 1892, he was an unsuccessful Democratic candidate from the 11th district to the 53rd Congress to serve in the U.S. House, being defeated by John Avery. In 1904, he was an unsuccessful candidate for Governor of Michigan against Republican Fred M. Warner. In 1912, he was a delegate to Democratic National Convention which nominated Woodrow Wilson for U.S. President.

Ferris was elected Governor of Michigan in 1912, becoming the first Democratic governor of that state in 20 years, and served from 1913 to 1917. During his tenure, a farm colony for epileptics was established, as well as the Central Michigan Tuberculosis Sanatorium, and the bitter Copper Country Strike of 1913–1914 occurred. In 1914 and while holding the office of Governor, he was named as an Honorary President of the First National Conference on Race Betterment, a conference on eugenics held at the Battle Creek Sanatorium; because of the mine strike, he did not attend the conference. In 1916, he was again a delegate to Democratic National Convention which nominated President Woodrow Wilson for re-election. He also received the nickname, "Good Gray Governor". On March 23, 1917, fewer than three months after departing office, his wife Helen died after 43 years of marriage.

In 1920, he was an unsuccessful candidate for Governor, being defeated by Alex Groesbeck. On August 14, 1921, he married Mary E. McCloud (1882–1954).

In 1922, Ferris was elected to the United States Senate; he served alongside Republican James Couzens beginning March 4, 1923. As a senator and former teacher, Ferris supported the establishment of a federal Department of Education. In 1924, Ferris was again a delegate to the Democratic National Convention and was, for the first time, named by his fellow delegates as a candidate for the presidential nomination. After receiving 30 votes on the first ballot, which placed his candidacy in eighth place, Ferris's prospects faded and his delegates turned to other candidates. The convention eventually nominated John W. Davis, who lost to Calvin Coolidge.

Death
Exactly 11 years after his first wife died, Ferris died in office in Washington, DC, at the age of 75 and is interred at Highlandview Cemetery of Big Rapids along with his first wife, Helen, and his two sons Carleton and Phelps. He died from complications of pneumonia on March 23, 1928.

See also
List of United States Congress members who died in office (1900–49)

References

Further reading

External links

National Governors Association
Political Graveyard

Autobiography at Ferris State University
Biography at Ferris State University

1853 births
1928 deaths
Democratic Party governors of Michigan
People from Big Rapids, Michigan
Candidates in the 1924 United States presidential election
20th-century American politicians
American Unitarians
Burials in Michigan
Democratic Party United States senators from Michigan
University of Michigan Medical School alumni
People from Pittsfield, Illinois